Robert Yates is the name of:

 Robert Yates (NASCAR owner) (1943–2017), NASCAR team owner
 Robert Yates Racing, the team he owned
 Robert Yates (politician) (1738–1801), Anti-Federalist American politician
 Robert Yates (New Zealand cricketer) (1845–1931), New Zealand cricketer
 Robert Yates (English cricketer) (born 1999), English cricketer
 Robert Lee Yates (born 1952), serial killer
 Robert D. Yates (1857–1885), American draughts champion and medical doctor